Maria Ilinca Băcilă (born 17 August 1998), also known as simply Ilinca, is a Romanian singer and yodeler. She is well known for her unique yodel. She participated in the Eurovision Song Contest 2017, representing Romania, along with Alex Florea.

Career

2012–14: Românii au talent, X Factor & Vocea Romaniei
In 2012, Ilinca participated in the second season of Românii au talent.

In 2013, Ilinca participated in the third season of X Factor with Trupa Quattro.

In 2014, Ilinca participated in the 4th season of Vocea Romaniei, where she reached the semi final.

2017–present: Eurovision Song Contest
Along with Alex Florea, Ilinca represented Romania in the Eurovision Song Contest 2017, coming in 7th place with the song "Yodel It!".

On 11 May 2017, a few hours before the second semifinal of the Eurovision contest, another of her songs, "Amici", was published.

Discography

Singles

Awards and nominations

See also
Alex Florea
Romania in the Eurovision Song Contest 2017

References

External links

Romanian child singers
Eurovision Song Contest entrants of 2017
Eurovision Song Contest entrants for Romania
Living people
1998 births
Romanian women pop singers
People from Târgu Mureș
The Voice (franchise) contestants
Yodelers
21st-century Romanian singers
21st-century Romanian women singers